Ligota Wielka may refer to the following places in Poland:
Ligota Wielka, Dzierżoniów County in Lower Silesian Voivodeship (south-west Poland)
Ligota Wielka, Oleśnica County in Lower Silesian Voivodeship (south-west Poland)
Ligota Wielka, Kędzierzyn-Koźle County in Opole Voivodeship (south-west Poland)
Ligota Wielka, Nysa County in Opole Voivodeship (south-west Poland)